During the time of the deposition of the Niobrara Chalk, much life inhabited the seas of the Western Interior Seaway. By this time in the Late Cretaceous many new lifeforms appeared such as mosasaurs, which were to be some of the last of the aquatic lifeforms to evolve before the end of the Mesozoic. Life of the Niobrara Chalk is comparable to that of the Dakota Formation, although the Dakota Formation, which was deposited during the Cenomanian, predates the chalk by about 10 million years.

Table key

Bony fish

Pycnodontiformes

Semionotiformes

Pachycormiformes

Crossognathiformes

Ichthyodectiformes

Tselfatiiformes

Aulopiformes

Beryciformes

Other bony fish

Cartilaginous fish
Fish are by far the most common fossils found from the formation, with remains of prehistoric sharks, ray-finned fishes, and lobe-finned fishes in abundance. As well as smaller fish, many large predatory fish were present in the seas at that time, most notably Xiphactinus. Several fish were of close relation to modern day fish including primitive coelacanths, slime heads, lancetfish, gars, swordfish, and salmonids.

Sharks

Other cartilaginous fish

Dinosaurs
 Nonavian dinosaurs have been found in the Niobrara Chalk despite it being located hundreds of miles out to sea at the time. The most reasonable theory is that the carcasses drifted out to sea. It is unlikely that the bodies were carried out by outgoing tides along the shorelines where they died, but rather it is more probable that the dinosaurs were carried offshore by floodwaters during a storm. In the shallow waters the bodies would have begun to decompose and bacteria within the carcass would have produced gasses that would have accumulated in the gut, thereby making the body buoyant. Next, the prevailing winds and currents would have carried it out to sea, where it would eventually settle to the bottom and be buried in sediment.

A few caudal vertebrae from a hadrosaur have been found with bite marks and have been eroded, suggesting at one point they were digested. A single tooth belonging to Squalicorax was found in situ under the vertebrae. This suggested the shark consumed the posterior end of the tail of a floating hadrosaur carcass and had partially digested it before fossilization. Most dinosaurs in the chalk were nodosaurs. The dinosaurs found here were endemic to Appalachia.

Non-avian

Birds
Three genre of birds are present in the formation, although rare. They were unrelated to modern birds, as they still retained teeth. Baptornis and Hesperornis were large flightless aquatic birds suited for diving. Ichthyornis was a seabird that resembled the gulls and petrels of today. Both probably preyed on small fish and were preyed upon by sharks, large bony fish such as Xiphactinus, and mosasaurs.

Invertebrates
Clams, oysters, crinoids, ammonites, and squid are all common in the Niobrara Chalk and must have constituted the majority of life at the time. Evidence of sponges, annelid worms, and crustaceans are less common and are usually found as trace fossils.

Bivalves

Cephalopods

Echinoderms

Mosasaurs

Mosasaurs are the most common marine reptiles in the Niobrara Chalk and the most successful ones in the sea at the time. Four different genre representing the four different subfamilies of Mosasauridae: the Tylosaurinae, Plioplatecarpinae, Mosasaurinae, and Halisaurinae, were present in Niobrara. They were the dominant carnivorous marine reptiles and ate cephalopods, fish, turtles, pterosaurs, birds, and even plesiosaurs. There is evidence of them consuming other smaller mosasaurs. Despite this, mosasaurs often fell prey to some of the large sharks at the time, such as Cretoxyrhina.

The presence of young mosasaurs in the formation suggests that mosasaurs were viviparous and gave birth hundreds of miles out to sea, as Niobrara was in the middle of the Western Interior Seaway at the time. Juveniles would likely have been vulnerable to predation by the many large mid-ocean predators present in the ecosystem.

Plesiosaurs
Plesiosaurs are present from two different families within Plesiosauroidea in the Niobrara Chalk: the Polycotylidae, or short-necked plesiosaurs, and the Elasmosauridae, or long-necked plesiosaurs. Polycotylids superficially resemble pliosaurs, which are not present within the formation, but are unrelated. They were fast swimmers, unlike the Elasmosaurs that used their long necks to catch fish. Plesiosaurs are rare in the formation and were therefore likely uncommon in the Western Interior Seaway at the time. Specimens become much more numerous in the Pierre Shale situated above the chalk.

Pterosaurs
Two genre of pterosaurs are present in the formation, both within Pterodactyloidea: the pteranodontid Pteranodon (sometimes broken into several genera like Geosternbergia and Dawndraco, though this is dubious) and the nyctosaurid Nyctosaurus. They are large pterosaurs with elongated cranial crests. The pterosaurs of Niobrara probably spent most of their time at sea and rarely went on land, with Nyctosaurus being a probably fully pelagic animal. Pteranodon probably foraged on the ocean surface, while Nyctosaurus was a frigatebird-like aerial predator.

Turtles
Sea turtles have been found from the Niobrara Chalk that reached large sizes. The biggest, Archelon, attained a length of up to 4m, and was about 4.87m from flipper to flipper, considerably larger than its distant relative, the leatherback sea turtle, which is the largest of the sea turtles alive today. The sea turtles most likely fed on ammonites, squid, and other cephalopods.

Footnotes

References
 Everhart, Michael J. Oceans Of Kansas: A Natural History Of The Western Interior Sea (Life of the Past). Bloomington: Indiana University Press, 2005. 322 pp.
 Everhart, Michael J. 2006. "The Occurrence of Elasmosaurids (Reptilia: Plesiosauria) in the Niobrara Chalk of Western Kansas"; Paludicila; 5(4) pp. 170–183
 Shimada, K.  2007.  "Skeletal and dental anatomy of lamniform shark, Cretalamna appendiculata from Upper Cretaceous Niobrara Chalk of Kansas".  Journal of Vertebrate Paleontology, 27(3):584–602.
 Weishampel, David B.; Dodson, Peter; and Osmólska, Halszka (eds.): The Dinosauria, 2nd, Berkeley: University of California Press. 861 pp. .

Geology of Kansas
Upper Cretaceous Series of North America